The 3rd constituency of the Pas-de-Calais is a French legislative constituency in the Pas-de-Calais département.

Description

Pas-de-Calais' 3rd constituency is based around the city of Lens in the heart of the department famed for its football team and its mines.

Until 2017, the seat was held by Guy Delcourt who previously represented Pas-de-Calais' 13th constituency until its extinction as a result of the 2010 redistricting of French legislative constituencies. In 2017 the seat was won by José Évrard of the National Front, however in November of that year he joined the breakaway The Patriots party led by Florian Philippot. Évrard died in January 2022 and was replaced by his substitute Emmanuel Blairy from the National Rally.

Historic representation

Election results

2022

 
 
 
 
 
 
 
 
|-
| colspan="8" bgcolor="#E9E9E9"|
|-
 
 

 
 
 
 
 

* LREM dissident

2017

2012

 
 
 
 
 
 
|-
| colspan="8" bgcolor="#E9E9E9"|
|-

2007

 
 
 
 
 
 
|-
| colspan="8" bgcolor="#E9E9E9"|
|-

2002

 
 
 
 
 
|-
| colspan="8" bgcolor="#E9E9E9"|
|-

1997

 
 
 
 
 
|-
| colspan="8" bgcolor="#E9E9E9"|
|-

Sources
 Official results of French elections from 1998: 

3